Lakai may refer to:

Lakai Limited Footwear, a footwear company based in Torrance, California
Lakai (tribe), a tribe of ethnic Uzbeks located in Central Asia